Synchrony may refer to:

 Synchronization, the coordination of events to operate a system in unison
 Synchrony and diachrony, viewpoints in linguistic analysis
 Synchrony Financial, an American financial services company
 Synchrony (Dune), a fictional planet
 "Synchrony" (The X-Files), an episode of the American science fiction television series The X-Files

See also 
 
 
 Synchronic (disambiguation)
 Synchronicity (disambiguation)